Kai Ishizawa (born 23 November 1996) is a Japanese professional boxer. He is a one-time world title challenger, having fought for the WBO mini flyweight title in 2022.

Personal life
Ishizawa played soccer and practiced karate in elementary school and took up boxing in the first grade of junior high school. He was the captain of the boxing club in Buso Junior High School.

Ishizawa graduated from the Nippon Sport Science University.

Professional career
Ishizawa made his professional debut on June 3, 2017, with a second-round knockout of fellow debutante Phongsaphon Panyakum. Ishizawa followed this up with stoppage victories of Yoshimitsu Kushibe on August 4, 2017, Narathip Sungsut on January 30, 2018, and Tatsuro Nakashima on August 4, 2018. These four victories earned him the chance to fight Daiki Tomita for the inaugural Japanese Youth minimumweight championship. He was later forced to withdraw due to an injury.

After recovering from his injury, Ishizawa was scheduled to fight the undefeated Yuga Inoue for the inaugural Japanese minimumweight championship on November 10, 2018. He won the fight by a sixth-round technical knockout.

Ishizawa was scheduled to fight the Indonesian national mini-flyweight champion Silem Serang on June 1, 2019. He won the fight by a fourth-round technical knockout, stopping Serang with eight seconds left in the round. Ishizawa was next scheduled to face Masataka Taniguchi, in a Japanese minimumweight title eliminator match, on September 21, 2019. Taniguchi won the fight by unanimous decision, with scores of 77–74, 77-74 and 78–74.

Ishizawa rebounded from his first professional loss with a sixth-round technical knockout of Masashi Tada on October 13, 2020. Ishizawa was next scheduled to fight Yuni Takada for the Japanese Youth minimumweight title on April 21, 2021. He won the fight by majority decision, with scores of 78–74, 76-76 and 79–73.

Ishizawa was scheduled to face Naoya Haruguchi on October 8, 2021, in a Japanese minimumweight title eliminator match. He won the fight by a fourth-round technical knockout.

Ishizawa was scheduled to face the undefeated Katsuki Mori for the Japanese minumweight title in the main event of "Phoenix Battle 83" at the Korakuen Hall in Tokyo, Japan on January 11, 2022. He won the fight by an eight-round technical knockout. Ishizawa dropped Mori to the canvas with a flurry of punches, which prompted his corner to throw in the towel. Ishizawa called out the reigning WBO mini-flyweight champion Masataka Taniguchi during his post-fight interview.

Ishizawa is booked to challenge the reigning WBO mini-flyweight champion Masataka Taniguchi on 22 April 2022, in the main event of a Hikari TV broadcast PBX card, which will take place at the Korakuen Hall in Tokyo, Japan. The bout is a rematch of their September 21, 2019 meeting, which Taniguchi won by unanimous decision. Ishizawa vacated the Japanese minimumweight title on 3 March. Ishizawa failed to make weight for the title bout, as he weighed in 2.5 kg over the championship limit in his first attempt and 2.3 kg over the limit in his second attempt. Ishizawa was allowed to compete after making 49.9 kg on the day of the fight, although he was ineligible to win the title. He lost the fight by an eleventh-round technical knockout, and was down on all three of the judges scorecards at the time of the stoppage.

On July 19, 2022, it was announced that JBC had handed Ishizawa a six-month ban for missing weight against Taniguchi. The suspension was backed dated to April 22 and was accompanied by a strict caution by his gym and gym manager.

Professional boxing record

References

1996 births
Living people
Sportspeople from Kanagawa Prefecture
Japanese male boxers
Mini-flyweight boxers